Charles F. Smith Jr. (July 16, 1918 – April 17, 2001) was a Republican member of the Wisconsin Senate, representing the 29th District from 1963 to 1967. He served on the Wausau, Wisconsin Common Council and the Marathon County, Wisconsin Board of Supervisors and was its chairman. Smith practiced law. He died in Wausau, Wisconsin.

Smith graduated from the University of Wisconsin–Madison with a B.A. in 1941, and a LL.B. in 1948. He was a veteran of World War II, serving in the Army overseas for four years.

He was a member of the Elks Lodge, American Legion, and the local Rotary Club.

References

Wisconsin city council members
County supervisors in Wisconsin
Republican Party Wisconsin state senators
Military personnel from Wisconsin
United States Army personnel of World War II
People from Rhinelander, Wisconsin
Politicians from Wausau, Wisconsin
University of Wisconsin–Madison alumni
University of Wisconsin Law School alumni
Wisconsin lawyers
20th-century American politicians
20th-century American lawyers
1918 births
2001 deaths